Roman Lutsyshyn (born ) is a Ukrainian male track cyclist. He competed at the 2013 UCI Track Cycling World Championships. In 2014 he rode in the scratch event and points race event at the 2014 UCI Track Cycling World Championships.

References

External links
 Profile at cyclingarchives.com

1994 births
Living people
Ukrainian track cyclists
Ukrainian male cyclists
Place of birth missing (living people)